Ron Arthun was a Republican member of the Montana Legislature.  He was elected for Senate District 31, representing the Wilsall, Montana area, in 2010.  Arthun graduated from Montana State University with an agriculture degree. Besides maintaining a ranch, Arthun performs with the Ringling 5 travelling group. He retired in 2016.

References

External links
 Home page

Living people
Year of birth missing (living people)
Republican Party Montana state senators
People from Park County, Montana
Montana State University alumni